"Fai rumore" is a song written and performed by Italian singer Antonio Diodato. It was released as a single on 7 February 2020 and was featured on his album Che vita meravigliosa. The song won the Sanremo Music Festival 2020, and would have represented Italy in the Eurovision Song Contest 2020 in Rotterdam, Netherlands, before the event's cancellation due to the COVID-19 pandemic. It topped the Italian singles chart in its second week of release. This song won Eurovision-Gleði – Okkar 12 stig, an Icelandic alternative show for the Eurovision Song Contest 2020.

Eurovision Song Contest

The song would have represented Italy in the Eurovision Song Contest 2020, after Diodato was selected through Sanremo Music Festival 2020, the music competition that selects Italy's entries for the Eurovision Song Contest. As Italy is a member of the "Big Five", the song automatically advanced to the final, which would have been held on 16 May 2020 in Rotterdam, Netherlands. It was also one amongst the favourites to win the competition if it had not been cancelled.
"Fai rumore" was performed again twice, first during Eurovision: Europe Shine a Light in an empty Verona Arena, and during the first semi-final of the Eurovision Song Contest 2022 in Turin as an interval act.

Music video 
The music video for "Fai rumore" was directed by Giorgio Testi. As of May 2022, the video has over 72 million views on YouTube.

Track listing

Charts

Certifications

Release history

References

2020 singles
2020 songs
Eurovision songs of 2020
Eurovision songs of Italy
Number-one singles in Italy
Sanremo Music Festival songs